The Man Who Murdered is a 1931 German crime drama film directed by Curtis Bernhardt and starring Conrad Veidt, Trude von Molo and Heinrich George. It is adapted from the play by Pierre Frondaie. The film's sets were designed by the art directors Heinrich Richter and Hermann Warm. Location filming took place in Istanbul. It premiered at the Gloria-Palast in Berlin.

The following year a separate English version, Stamboul, was made.

Cast
 Conrad Veidt as Marquis de Sévigné
 Trude von Molo as Lady Falkland
 Heinrich George as Lord Falkland
 Friedl Haerlin as Lady Edith
 Frida Richard as Lady Foult
 Friedrich Kayßler as Mehmed Pascha
 Gregori Chmara as Prince Cernuwicz
 Erich Ponto as Boucher - franz. Gesandter
 Hans-Joachim Möbis as Terrail
 Yvette Rodin as Mme. Terrail
 Rolf Drucker as George Falkland - Sohn
 Bruno Ziener as Prospère - Diener bei Sévigné

See also
The Right to Love (1920)
Stamboul (1931)

References

Bibliography

External links 
 

1931 films
Films of the Weimar Republic
German crime films
1931 crime films
1930s German-language films
Films directed by Curtis Bernhardt
German multilingual films
Terra Film films
German black-and-white films
Films with screenplays by Carl Mayer
Films scored by Hans J. Salter
1931 multilingual films
1930s German films
Films shot in Istanbul
Films set in Istanbul
Films set in 1912